Cornelius A. Davenport was a member of the Wisconsin State Assembly.

Biography
Davenport was born on July 3, 1843 in Antwerp, New York. He moved to Nepeuskun, Wisconsin in 1855 before later living in Waushara County, Wisconsin. During the American Civil War, Davenport served with the 30th Wisconsin Volunteer Infantry Regiment of the Union Army. He died in 1920.

Political career
Davenport was elected to the Assembly in 1890 and 1892. Other positions he held include Sheriff of Waushara County in 1885 and 1886. He was a Republican.

References

External links

People from Antwerp, New York
People from Winnebago County, Wisconsin
People from Waushara County, Wisconsin
Republican Party members of the Wisconsin State Assembly
Wisconsin sheriffs
People of Wisconsin in the American Civil War
Union Army soldiers
1843 births
1920 deaths
Burials in Wisconsin